The white-bellied moss mouse (Pseudohydromys sandrae) is a species of mouse endemic to Papua New Guinea. It was first described in 2009. The type specimen was an adult male found between 800 and 850 m, in Southern Highlands Province of Papua New Guinea.

References

External links

 

Pseudohydromys
Mammals described in 2009
Mammals of Papua New Guinea
Endemic fauna of Papua New Guinea
Rodents of New Guinea